The Karen National Association (KNA) was a political party in Burma.

History
The KNA was established in 1881, the first modern political party in the country. It represented the Christian Karen and Sgaw communities, replacing the American Baptist missionaries as the main voice of the Karens to the colonial government.

The party joined the Burma for the Burmans League in the late 1920s, and was a member of the Separation League for the 1932 general elections. It was disbanded during World War II.

References

Defunct political parties in Myanmar
1881 establishments in Burma
Political parties established in 1881